Glanidium botocudo is a species of driftwood catfishes found in coastal rivers systems, such as the  Rio Doce and the Rio Mucuri in Brazil.

References

Catfish of South America
Fish of the Doce River basin
Fish of the Mucuri River basin
Taxa named by Luisa Maria Sarmento-Soares
Taxa named by Ronaldo Fernando Martins-Pinheiro
Fish described in 2013
Auchenipteridae